Alessandro Rambaldini (born 12 October 1980) is an Italian male mountain runner, world champion at the 2016 World Long Distance Mountain Running Championships and 2018 World Long Distance Mountain Running Championships.

National titles
Italian Long Distance Mountain Running Championships
Long distance mountain running: 2018 (1)

References

External links
 
 
 Alessandro Rambaldini at FIDAL 

1980 births
Living people
Italian male mountain runners
World Long Distance Mountain Running Championships winners
21st-century Italian people